Andrew Charles McGarry (born 8 November 1981) is an English former cricketer. Born in Basildon, he was a right-handed batsman and a right-arm fast-medium bowler. During his career in First Class and List A cricket he played for Essex and Suffolk.

After a debut performance in the Sri Lanka A tour in July 1999, he waited a year before another first-class appearance, waiting until the 2000 County Championship before a debut against Worcestershire in which he was caught-and-bowled off the bowling of Vikram Solanki, and took five wickets in total with his bowling.

For the second half of the 2004 season until the end of the 2006 season McGarry played for Suffolk in the Minor Counties Championship. Due to a run of injuries in the Essex squad, he was re-signed for the 2007 season, but having played just a handful of games, suffered a broken hand, and was again released at the end of the season. He, once again, played for Suffolk during the 2008 season.

In 2017 he was appointed head coach of Old Southendian & Southchurch Cricket Club.

References

External links
Andrew McGarry at Cricket Archive 

1981 births
Bedfordshire cricketers
English cricketers
Essex cricketers
Living people
Sportspeople from Basildon
People educated at King Edward VI Grammar School, Chelmsford
Suffolk cricketers
Unicorns cricketers